Bademli is a village in İzmir Province, Turkey. Aegean Sea coast is only  to west. The population of the village was 1077 as of 2011.

References

Mediterranean Region, Turkey
Villages in Dikili District
Populated coastal places in Turkey